Henri Bosco (16 November 1888 – 4 May 1976) was a French writer. He was nominated for the Nobel Prize in Literature four times.

Life
Bosco was born in Avignon, Vaucluse into a family of Provençal, Ligurian and Piedmontese origin. Through his father, he was related to Saint John Bosco, of whom he wrote a biography. His novels for adults and children provide a sensitive evocation of Provençal life. In 1945 he was awarded the Prix Renaudot for his novel Le Mas Théotime (The Farm Théotime). Other awards he received were the Prix des Ambassadeurs in 1949, the Grand prix national des Lettres in 1953, the Prix de l'Académie de Vaucluse in 1966, the Grand prix de la Mediterranée in 1967, and the Grand Prix de Littérature de l'Académie française in 1968. He died in Nice and was buried at the cemetery of Lourmarin.

Bibliography 

 Pierre Lampédouze, 1924
 Le Sanglier, 1932
 Le Trestoulas with L'Habitant de Sivergues, 1935
 L'Ane Culotte, 1937 (Translated by Sister Mary Theresa McCarthy, Culotte the Donkey, 1978). Published in 1950 with illustrations by Nicolas Eekman.
 Hyacinthe, 1940
 L'Apocalypse de Saint Jean 1942
 Bucoliques de Provence, 1944
 Le Jardin d'Hyacinthe, 1945
 Le Mas Théotime, 1945 (Prix Renaudot 1945) (Translated by Mervyn Savill, The Farm Théotime, 1946)
 L'Enfant et la Rivière, 1945 (Translated by Gerard Hopkins, The Boy and the River, 1956)
 Monsieur Carre-Benoît à la campagne, 1947 (Translated by Mervyn Savill, Monsieur Carre-Benoît in the Country, 1958)
 Sylvius, 1948
 Malicroix, 1948 (translated by Joyce Zonana, 2020. )
 Le Roseau et la Source, 1949
 Un Rameau de la nuit, 1950 (Translated by Mervyn Savill, The Dark Bough, 1955)
 Des sables à la mer. Pages marocaines, 1950
 Sites et Mirages, 1951 
 Antonin, 1952
 L'Antiquaire, 1954
 Le Renard dans l'île, 1956 (Translated by Gerard Hopkins, The Fox in the Island, 1958) 
 Les Balesta, 1956
 Sabinus, 1957
 Barboche, 1957 (Translated by Gerard Hopkins, Barboche, 1959)
 Bargabot, 1958
 Saint Jean Bosco, 1959
 Un Oubli moins profond, 1961
 Le Chemin de Monclar, 1962  
 L'Epervier, 1963
 Le Jardin des Trinitaires, 1966
 Mon Compagnon de songes, 1967
 Le Récif, 1971
 Tante Martine, 1972
 Une Ombre, 1978   
 Des nuages, 1980

References

External links 

 Website about Henri Bosco 

Writers from Avignon
1888 births
1976 deaths
French children's writers
French people of Italian descent
People of Piedmontese descent
People of Ligurian descent
French Roman Catholic writers
Prix Renaudot winners
20th-century French novelists
20th-century French male writers